Colonel Moussa Sinko Coulibaly is the Minister of Territorial Administration, of Decentralization and of Territorial Planning of Mali since 24 April 2012.

References

Government ministers of Mali
Living people
Malian military personnel
Year of birth missing (living people)
21st-century Malian people